Kieron Barry is a British playwright. He was born in Stratford-upon-Avon.

Work

Barry's plays include Stockwell: The Inquest into the Death of Jean Charles de Menezes about the 2005 shooting of Brazilian Jean Charles de Menezes, which ran at London's Tricycle Theatre in 2009.

Published works
Numbers
Embassyland
Cumquats
Black Soap
Mahler and Rachmaninov

The works above have been published together under the title Five Plays.

Stockwell
Tomorrow in the Battle
The Official Adventures of Kieron and Jade 
The Problem of Sex, or: Why Are We in Afghanistan?

References

External links
 Roland Egan Productions website
 

English dramatists and playwrights
Living people
Year of birth missing (living people)
English male dramatists and playwrights